James Barton Adams (April 17, 1843 – April 22, 1918) was one of the few cowboy poets published prior to the 1900s, with the book, Breezy Western Verse in 1898. Adams' works were typically published in newspapers, as he was a telegraph operator and knew many journalists.

Adams was included in several collections, including John A. Lomax's Songs of the Cattle Train and Cow Camp (Macmillan Co., 1919). In 1945, Louis Untermeyer included Adams' poem, "Bill's in Trouble" in the collection, The Pocket Book of Story Poems (Pocket Books, Inc. 1945).  Most recently, Adams' poems, The Cowboy's Dance Song and Cowboy Goes a Courtin, were included in the book, Cowboy Love Poetry: Verse from the Heart of the West (Angel City Press, 1994).

References

External links
 

19th-century American poets
American male poets
1843 births
1918 deaths
19th-century American male writers
Deaths from pneumonia in Washington (state)